Fujimacia is a genus of snout moths. It contains only one species, Fujimacia bicoloralis, which is found in Korea, Japan, China, Taiwan and India.

The wingspan is 15–18 mm. The ground colour of the forewings is dark red. Adults are on wing from July to August.

References

Pyralini
Monotypic moth genera
Moths of Asia
Pyralidae genera